The Beijing Pop Music Awards, formerly known as Chinese Music Radio Awards between 2000–2006, is a Chinese music awards founded by Beijing Music Radio in 1993 to recognize Chinese popular music.

Ceremonies

Categories 
2012 Beijing Pop Music Awards
 Most Popular New Artist
 Best New Singer-Songwriter
 Best New Artist
 Best Lyrics
 Best Composition
 Best Arrangement
 Best Single Producer
 Best Album Producer
 Best Singer-Songwriter
 Best Band/Group
 Style Breakthrough Award
 Best All-Round Artist
 Media Recommend Artist
 Best Female Stage Performance
 Best Male Stage Performance
 Best Female Singer
 Best Male Singer
 Best EP
 Best Album
 Most Popular Female Singer
 Most Popular Male Singer
 Outstanding Achievement Award
 Songs of the Year

References 

Chinese music awards